Barramundi may refer to:

Australian names for fish
 Barramundi or Asian sea bass  (Lates calcarifer), saltwater fish of the Indian and western Pacific oceans
 Barramundi or Gulf saratoga  (Scleropages jardinii), freshwater fish of the Gulf of Carpentaria drainage system
 Barramundi or southern saratoga (Scleropages leichardti), freshwater fish of the Fitzroy River system
 Barramundi cod or humpback grouper  (Cromileptes altivelis), saltwater fish of the western Pacific Ocean
 Rock barramundi or mangrove red snapper (Lutjanus argentimaculatus), saltwater fish of the Indian and western Pacific oceans
 Waigeo barramundi or Waigieu seaperch (Psammoperca waigiensis), saltwater fish of the Indian and western Pacific oceans

Other
 "Barramundi", codename for the Ford Barra engine introduced in 2002
 Barramundi orogeny, orogenic event between 1.88 and 1.84 billion years ago affecting Mount Isa and Pine Creek orogenic domains in Australia
 Barramundi Gorge or Maguk, waterfall in Kakadu National Park, Northern Territory, Australia
 Barramundi, final tribe in Survivor: The Australian Outback, a 2001 reality television series

See also
 Barramunda or Australian lungfish (Neoceratodus forsteri)
 Barry Munday, 2010 American comedy film